National College of Ireland (NCI) or Coláiste Náisiúnta na hÉireann (CNÉ) in Irish is a not-for-profit, state-aided third-level education institution in Dublin. It was founded in 1951 as a joint venture between Irish Jesuits and Irish Trade Unions and originally named the Catholic Workers College, Dublin. It is now an autonomous college, offering full and part-time courses from undergraduate to postgraduate level, in areas related to, among others, psychology, finance, business and computing. The courses are delivered from the IFSC campus in Dublin and across a network of regional centres.

NCI's specialist areas include psychology, human resource management, data analytics, management, cloud computing, fintech, accountancy, cybersecurity, education, and finance. NCI is also known for its free public events which include the dot conf digital and web technology conference, the Legends in Your Lunchtime series, the Seven Deadly Skills, In the Psychologists' Chair and Marketing Mavericks.

History 

In 1951, the National College of Ireland started out as the Catholic Workers College, Dublin in Sandford Lodge, Ranelagh. Founded by Fr. Edward Coyne S.J., in association with Trade Unionists such as Walter Beirne others involved in the college in its initial years included Professor Thomas A. Finlay S.J., and Rev. Edmund Kent S.J. among others.

Lectures were led by a handful of dedicated Jesuits two nights a week, with 103 registered students in the first year. Within 10 years, student numbers had dramatically increased. Links with trade unions deepened, as did formal collaborations with employer and management groups.

By 1966, nearly 1,300 students from trade union and business management backgrounds were learning together at the re-branded National College of Industrial Relations (NCIR).

In 1976 the college achieved recognition by the states National Council for Educational Awards (NCEA), the forerunner of HETAC, for a number of its programmes.

The institution again re-branded as the National College of Ireland (NCI) in 1998, with an expanded National Campus Network, and an array of outreach programmes across the country.

As the NCI continued to grow, the land and buildings at Sandford Road were transferred by the Jesuits to the NCI Board of Management.

The college’s Higher Certificate, Bachelor, Higher Diploma, and Master courses are accredited by the Irish government's Quality and Qualifications Ireland (QQI); a number of other short term courses are unaccredited.

At the turn of the century, NCI relocated to a  site on Mayor Street in the Dublin Docklands. A€25,000,000 fundraising campaign resulted in the development of a modern campus including 53 residential apartments accommodating 286 students and a new Business and Research Building.

In 2009 and 2010 the college ran a series of free debates called the Insight Debate Series, organised in partnership with The Irish Times and the radio station Newstalk 106-108 FM. The college's Legends in your Lunchtime series saw public figures such as Ben Dunne, Willie Walsh and Giovanni Trapattoni interviewed live by a Newstalk presenter. In 2012 the College's chairman Denis O'Brien and Jeffrey Ullman, emeritus Stanford professor and 2020 ACM A.M. Turing Award winner, opened the NCI's Cloud Competency Centre.

NCI was successful in 2021 in joining the European, Erasmus Charter in Higher Education (ECHE).

Courses
Full and part-time, undergraduate and postgraduate courses in computing, business, early childhood education, psychology, data analytics, marketing, digital marketing, cybersecurity, human resource management, cloud computing, accountancy, and finance are offered through the College's Schools of Business and Computing. A number of professional development programmes are also offered. A full list is available on the college website.

Presidents
Fr. Edward Coyne S.J. (1951–1954)
Fr. Edmund Kent S.J. (1954–1968)
Fr. Kevin Quinn S.J. (1968–1972)
Fr. John Brady S.J. (1972–1981) 
Fr. William Toner S.J.(1981–1983)
Fr. Tom Morrissey S.J. (1983–1989)
Prof. Joyce O'Connor (1990–2007)
Dr. Paul Mooney (2007–2010)
Dr. Phillip Matthews (2010–2016)
Ms. Gina Quin (2016–present)

In February 2010 Dr. Phillip Matthews joined as president of the college, succeeding Dr. Paul Mooney. In August 2016, Dr. Matthews was succeeded by Gina Quin, the former CEO of Dublin Chamber of Commerce.

Honorary Fellowship
The National College of Ireland, as did its predecessor, the National College of Industrial Relations, awards an Honorary Fellowship from time to time. Awardees have included:
 1988 - Sheila Conroy - trade unionist and president of The People's College
 1998 - Dan McCauley
 1998 - Con Murphy - Chair of ESB Industrial Council
 2005 - Prof. John Hopcroft - computer scientist and 1986 ACM A.M. Turing Award winner.
 2009 - Rev. John Brady SJ - economist, who worked for the college for thirty years
 2009 - Ken Doherty - former snooker world champion
 2009 - Maurice Healy - CEO of the Healy group 
 2015 - Rev. Dr. Noel Barber SJ - who served on the board of the NCI

References
 ncirl.ie, 27 February 2010

External links
 National College of Ireland Website
Gina Quin to become National College of Ireland President
 how do data analytics tools help in business

 
North Wall, Dublin
Business schools in the Republic of Ireland
Educational institutions established in 1951
Education in Dublin (city)
1951 establishments in Ireland